Arak County is in Markazi province, Iran. The capital of the county is the city of Arak; its former name was Sultanabad. At the 2006 census, the county's population was 602,971 in 165,955 households. The following census in 2011 counted 599,634 people in 182,749 households, by which time Khondab District had been separated from the county to form Khondab County. At the 2016 census, the county's population was 591,756 in 188,180 households.

Administrative divisions

The population history and structural changes of Arak County's administrative divisions over three consecutive censuses are shown in the following table. The latest census shows three districts, 11 rural districts, and four cities.

References

 

Counties of Markazi Province